Toyama may refer to:

Places and organizations
 Toyama Prefecture, a prefecture of Japan located in the Hokuriku region on the main Honshu island
 Toyama, Toyama, the capital city of Toyama Prefecture
 Toyama Station, the main station of Toyama, Toyama
 Toyama Stadium, a multi-purpose stadium located in the city of Toyama
 Kataller Toyama, a professional football club formed from the merger of the ALO's Hokuriku and YKK AP clubs that plays in Toyama Stadium
 Toyama, Shinjuku, a district in Shinjuku ward in Tokyo, Japan
 Toyama Domain, a feudal domain in Edo period Japan

People
, a samurai and official of the Tokugawa shogunate during the Edo period of Japanese history
, a video game designer and creator of the survival horror video game series Silent Hill and Siren
, a Japanese street musician and political activist
Michiko Toyama (1908–2000), Japanese American composer
, nationalist political leader in early 20th-century Japan and founder of the Gen'yōsha nationalist secret society
, Okinawan journalist
, Japanese professional shogi player
, Japanese composer and conductor

Japanese-language surnames